Hugo Hercules is an American weekly comic strip published in the Chicago Tribune, written and drawn by Wilhelm Heinrich Detlev Körner. It ran for five months, from September 7, 1902 to January 11, 1903, totaling seventeen strips. Despite its short run, it's considered the earliest superhero fiction comic.

Characters and story
A good-natured man endowed with superhuman strength, Hugo wandered about town, helping people with their problems and shocking them with his surprising displays of power. He was so strong he could pick up an elephant, kick a house like a football, wield an artillery cannon like a handgun, and lift a locomotive engine off the tracks and pull its cargo behind him at train speeds. Casual about his incredible feats, Hugo often repeated his catchphrase, "Just as easy", shrugging off the adoring crowds.

Sometimes referred to as the first superhero, the strip was not a great success and Körner eventually left comics to become a painter.

Strips
 Sept 7, 1902: Hugo Hercules Obliges Beauty in Distress.
 Sept 14: Hugo Hercules Stops the Terrible Runaway.
 Sept 21: Hugo Hercules to the Rescue Once More.
 Sept 28: (no strip)
 Oct 5: Hugo Hercules Rescues Lady Disdain Once More.
 Oct 12: Hugo Hercules Performs Another Prodigy.
 Oct 19: (no strip)
 Oct 26: Now, Wasn't This Kind of Hugo Hercules?
 Nov 2: Hugo Hercules Saves Four Comic Supplement Lives.
 Nov 9: Hugo Hercules Has a Great Pull with the Conductor.
 Nov 16: Hugo Hercules Misses the Football, But --"
 Nov 23: It's Just as Easy for Hercules to Make a Touchdown.
 Nov 30: Hugo Hercules Gets Along Quite Well Without a Cab.
 Dec 7: Hugo Hercules Does a Little Holding Up Himself.
 Dec 14: Hugo Hercules Comes to the Rescue of the Cannon Ball Limited.
 Dec 21: The Fire Engine Broke Down - But Hercules Was There.
 Dec 28: Hugo Hercules at New Year's Bowling Contest.
 Jan 4, 1903: Hugo Hercules Goes Ice Boating.
 Jan 11, 1903: Hugo Hercules Wrestles with a Bear.

Other appearances
Hugo Hercules appears in the 2015 graphic novel Nemo: River of Ghosts, written by Alan Moore and illustrated by Kevin O'Neill.

References

American comic strips
Hercules, Hugo
Hercules, Hugo
1902 comics debuts
1903 comics endings
Hercules, Hugo
Superhero comics
Hercules, Hugo
Hercules, Hugo
Hercules, Hugo
Comic strips started in the 1900s